Rajadurai Foundation was established in 2009 by Mylaudy Dr. S. Rajadurai, the mission of which is to build human potential through advancement of professional aspiration, academic scholarship, protection of environment and societies and gift real hope through all-inclusive partnership and spirituality.

Activities 
Rajadurai Foundation conducts several mentorship programs by delivering scientific and motivational lectures to encourage thousands of students, academicians and educators at different levels.  It inculcates the interest of  emission control in the minds of thousands of students in various institutions such as Hindustan University, Dr. Mahalingam College of Engineering and Technology, Bannari Amman Institute of Technology,  BS Abdur Rahman University, Loyola Institute of Technology and Science, Adhiparasakthi college of engineering, Karpagam University, Academy of Maritime Education and Training (AMET) University, SKR Engineering College, James Engineering College, Annai Vailankanni College of Engineering, SRM Institute of Science and Technology. Dr. Rajadurai is the Fellow of the Society of Automotive Engineering (SAE) International. He inaugurated SAE India Collegiate club to bring International Standard and enhance the formal education & professional development of students in various colleges including Annai Vailankanni College of Engineering. He also inaugurated Industry Institute Interaction Cell in  Annai Vailankanni College of Engineering to establish purposeful interaction between industry & institution and to assess the Scientific and Technological scenario in order to translate it into action.

Dr. Rajadurai as a Corporate Executive has been involved with various Research Institutes to close the gap between Innovative Inventions and Industrialization since 1990. He continues to dedicate his engagements on Industry University Interaction to bring forth best possible solutions for industrial problems. He is a Chairman of Industry Institute Interaction Cell (IIIC) in 2011 and Member of Governing Council since 2012,  Annai Vailankanni College of Engineering. He is a Member of Research Advisory Board (National) & Board of Research in 2018,  Hindustan Institute of Technology & Science. He is a Board of Studies Member in 2018  & Member of Advisory Committee in 2019  Bannari Amman Institute of Technology. He is a Member of Internal Quality Assurance Cell (IQAC)  & Institution Innovation Council (IIC) in 2019, Academy of Maritime Education and Training (AMET) University. Rajadurai Foundation established a merit award in Loyola college for the best student of M.Sc. chemistry in the name of Rev. Fr. Sebastian Kalarickal S.J, to recognize his dedicated services to students from the year 2006. He instituted Gurusmrithi Award in 2006 in Mar Ivanios College to be given to the Best Student of M.Sc. Chemistry every year.

Rajadurai Foundation provides awareness education programs in order to develop clean and green environment and to achieve carbon neutral earth. He Initiated and inaugurated Green Technology Centre in James Engineering College to motivate professors and students for a global approach to protect the environment from challenges such as acid rain, global warming, ozone depletion, rainforest deterioration, river contamination, sea level rise, accumulation of hazardous wastes, air pollution and over population, assisted SRM Institute of Science and Technology to develop  SAE BAJA Formula Race with CO2 reduction, also achieved Near Zero Emission and received National Award.

Rajadurai Foundation actively involves in conducting and supporting sports & cultural activities by Sponsored Anna University Volleyball Match Sports Day Volleyball League in 2018, presented Sponsor for Kanyakumari District Kabaddi team, who participated in Tamil Nadu State Level Kabbadi Tournament – 2019, sponsored RF cricket team participated in S.S.V. Boys 4th year Tennis Ball Cricket Tournament-2020 to develop identified talent and boost the morale & confidence of the young and dynamic players.

References 

Educational foundations
Environmental education
Social welfare charities
Foundations based in India